Statistics of Latvian Higher League in the 1990 season.

Overview
It was contested by 14 teams, and Gauja won the championship.

League standings

See also
 1990 Baltic League

References
RSSSF

Latvian SSR Higher League
Football
Latvia